Ormsby House is a closed hotel and casino in Carson City, Nevada. Originally opened in 1972, it closed on October 30, 2000, for extensive renovations. The re-opening was originally planned for July 4, 2001, but was pushed back many times due to many construction delays, many remodels, and management changes. Through January 2023,  the Ormsby House Hotel property is up for sale, and is expected to possibly be converted into housing and retail space.

History
The original Ormsby House was built in 1860 by Major William Ormsby, at the corner of 2nd and Carson Streets. Major Ormsby was killed later that same year in the Pyramid Lake War. The hotel lasted until the early 1900s, when it was purchased by Dominique Laxalt and later demolished.

In 1972, a brand new Ormsby House was built by Dominique's son, former Nevada Governor Paul Laxalt, at the corner of 5th and Carson Streets. In 1975, the Laxalts sold it to Woody Loftin and on his death in 1985, it passed to his son Truett Loftin. Loftin spent a large amount of money on a large parking structure. Around this time all casinos in Nevada began to receive competition from Indian casinos in California. The Ormsby House hotel was forced into bankruptcy protection in 1990 and in 1993 the property was foreclosed and shut down. The Ormsby House stayed closed until 1995, when it was reopened by Barry Silverton. In 1997, The Ormsby House went through bankruptcy and foreclosure again. This time the new owners appointed former lieutenant governor and future Reno mayor Bob Cashell as their general manager. Cashell managed well, and he turned the property around.

In 1999 Ormsby House was sold for $3.75 million to Carson City businessmen Al Fiegehen and Don Lehr, owners of Cubix Computer Corporation. They toyed with the idea of keeping the casino open during renovation, but finally decided to lay off all the employees and perform a complete inside-out renovation, which has now taken decades.

The Ormsby House was closed for work on October 30, 2000. Renovation was originally scheduled to be completed on July 4, 2001, but a combination of construction delays, numerous plan changes, permit problems, and ongoing perceived problems with the City of Carson City stretched the project out. At one point the owners became so frustrated dealing with the city due to the imposition of laws applying to an asbestos remodel, that they threatened to demolish the building. As of January 2023, the Ormsby House is still closed. 

The renovated Ormsby House is planned to feature a hotel, large casino, four bars, wedding chapel, coffeehouse, fine dining restaurant, a buffet, nightclub, and entertainment center. For many years a small slots and video poker casino and bar, the Winchester Club operated on Fridays and Saturdays in the hotel's parking structure in order to maintain the Nevada state gaming license.

In March 2018, Fieghen and Lehr allowed the building permit for the renovations to expire, and stated that the building would likely be converted to a mix of housing and retail rather than a hotel and casino. They reported that there had been ongoing interest from potential buyers, including three deals that had fallen through within the preceding six months.

References

External links
 Ormsby House Renovation Gallery (construction photos)
 
  Carsonpedia Ormsby House article

1972 establishments in Nevada
Casino hotels
Casinos completed in 1972
Casinos in Carson City, Nevada
Defunct hotels in Nevada
Defunct casinos in Nevada
Hotels in Carson City, Nevada
Landmarks in Nevada